The New Way (Derekh Hadasha) was a short-lived political faction in Israel in 2001.

Background
The faction was formed on 6 March 2001 when three MKs, Amnon Lipkin-Shahak, Dalia Rabin-Pelossof and Uri Savir, broke away from the Centre Party.

Two days after the party's formation Lipkin-Shahak and Savir resigned from the Knesset, and were replaced by new Centre Party MKs David Magen and Nehama Ronen. With Rabin-Pelossof as its only member, New Way carried on as a single-member group for a short time, before she joined the Labor Party faction of Ehud Barak's One Israel on 7 May 2001 and the group was dissolved.

References

External links
New Way Knesset website

Political parties established in 2001
Political parties disestablished in 2001
Defunct political parties in Israel
2001 establishments in Israel